Ignazio Guidi (1844 – 18 April 1935) was an Italian orientalist. He became professor at the University of Rome. He is known as a Hebraist and for many translations.

He learned semitic languages from Pius Zingerle and Father Vincenti, and taught himself Ge'ez.

He discovered the Khuzistan Chronicle, and edited the Chronicle of Edessa.

He also edited for the first time a letter of Simeon of Beth Arsham about the martyrs of Najran, the oldest evidence for this historical event.

He was the student of the Ethiopian scholar Däbtära Keflä-Giorgis, who played a "crucial role as teacher of the person who could be described as the father of Ethiopian studies in Italy, Ignazio Guidi."

Works
 1881: La lettera di Simeone vescovo di Bêth-Arśâm sopra i Martiri omeriti. Roma, Salviucci.
 1890: Al-Istidrāk ‘alā Sībawayh by Abū Bakr al-Zubaydī. Rome.
 1895: Il "Gadla 'Aragâwî" : memoria del socio Ignazio Guidi : letta nella seduta del 21 giugno 1891. Roma : Tip. della R. Accademia dei Lincei.
 1897: Il Fetha Nagast o "Legislazione dei Ref", Codice ecclesiastico e civile di Abissinia pubblicato da Ignazio Guidi. Roma: Casa editr. italiana.
 1900: (with: Rudolf-Ernst Brünnow, et al.) Tables alphabétiques du Kitâb al-aġânî ... Leiden, E.J. Brill.
 1901: (with: Francesco Gallina & Enrico Cerulli) Vocabolario amarico-italiano. Roma: Casa Editrice Italiana.
 1903: Chronica minora. 2 vols. (Corpus scriptorum Christianorum Orientalium) Lipsiae: Harrassowitz.
 1903: Annales Iohannis I, Iyāsu I, Bakāffā. Parisiis : E Typographeo Reipublicae.
 1931: Storia della letteratura etiopica

References
Biography

Notes

1844 births
1935 deaths
Italian orientalists
Linguists from Italy
Italian Hebraists
Corresponding Fellows of the British Academy